The Hong Kong Convention and Exhibition Centre (HKCEC) is one of the two major convention and exhibition venues in Hong Kong, along with AsiaWorld–Expo. It is located in Wan Chai North, Hong Kong Island. Built along the Victoria Harbour, it is linked by covered walkways to nearby hotels and commercial buildings. The venue was designed by Skidmore, Owings & Merrill LLP, in association with Wong & Ouyang (HK) Ltd. Larry Oltmanns led the design as the Design Partner with SOM.

Construction

The original building was built on reclaimed land off Gloucester Road in 1988. The glass curtain was the world's largest at the time, overlooking the Victoria Harbour on three sides.

The second phase of the centre, located on an artificial island, was constructed from 1994 to 1997, and features a bird-like rooftop (also referred to as a turtle by some critics). The project took only 48 months from reclamation to completion. The main constructor of the extension was a joint venture named Hip Hing Construction Co Ltd Dragages et Travaux Publics. Originally, Phase Two was connected to Phase One with an atrium link (a sky bridge), and to Convention Road with two road bridges, but now the two phases are connected by an expanded exhibition hall.

The complex's construction was financed by New World Development, with the Renaissance Harbour View Hotel, Grand Hyatt Hong Kong and Harbour View Apartments on top of it.

HKCEC made a second expansion during 2006–2009. Upon completion, the HK$1.4 billion expansion added 19,400 square metres to the HKCEC, bringing the total exhibition space to nearly 83,000 square metres and total rentable function space to over 92,000 square metres.

Management

The Hong Kong Convention and Exhibition Centre (Management) Limited (HML), a wholly owned subsidiary of NWS Holdings Ltd, is contracted by the HKTDC for the day-to-day management and operation of the HKCEC. The 850 member staff's responsibilities include administration, marketing, booking, scheduling, event co-ordination, maintenance, security and food and beverage operations. The latter including banqueting, and managing the centre's restaurants. The managing director of the company is Monica Lee-Müller.

There have been comments that the management of HKCEC provided preferential treatment to some client with regards to booking dates at the HKCEC. Cliff Wallace denied these allegations in a meeting with the Legislative Councilors in the 2003–2004 session. He said that his company did not provide preferential treatment, that dates were offered on a first-come-first-served basis and that standard industry practices were exercised with regards to booking and scheduling at the HKCEC as required by the operating agreement with HKTDC.

Convention facilities statistics 

5 exhibition halls: 53,292 m2
2 convention halls: 5,699 m2; total seating for 6,100
2 theatres: 800 m2; total seating for 1,000
52 meeting rooms: 6,004 m2
Pre-function areas: 8,000 m2
7 restaurants: total seating for 1,870
Business centre: 150 m2
Carpark spaces parking: for 1,300 cars and 60 vans
Total available rental space: 92,061 m2
Capacity: 140,000 visitors per day

Functions held at the site

Numerous functions are held at the HKCEC each year, including exhibitions, conventions/meetings, banquets, Hong Kong Book Fair and other special events.

The centre hosts more than 45 international trade fairs for buyers from more than 100 countries each year, including the world's largest leather fair and watch and clock fair. The regular international fairs for giftware, toys, fashion, jewellery, electronics and optical products are Asia's largest.

In addition, HKCEC hosts the annual film expo CineAsia where all major Hollywood studios present their upcoming productions to the Asian theatrical industry.

The HKCEC also includes provisions for video-conferencing, teleconferencing, satellite links, simultaneous interpretation in up to eight languages, audio-visual equipment, foyer registration space, and event signage.

It also served as the site of the 1997 Hong Kong handover ceremony, which signified the end of British colonial rule.

The Sixth WTO Ministerial Conference took place at the HKCEC from 13–18 December 2005. The NGO Centre was located at "Phase I" of the centre. This is the first time a WTO Ministerial Conference and the NGO Centre was located under the same roof as the Conference proceedings. (See also: the NGO section of the Host Government's website )

Access
Located on the north shore of Hong Kong Island, the HKCEC is easily accessible via the Star Ferry service, whose Wan Chai Pier is situated just east of the main building and operates from the HKCEC across Victoria Harbour to Tsim Sha Tsui Pier, adjacent to the Cultural Centre.

Wan Chai station on the Island line of the MTR is within walking distance and is linked to the HKCEC via a pedestrian bridge over O'Brien Road. Exhibition Centre station on the cross-harbour section of the East Rail line and the proposed North Island line is directly located under the HKCEC.

In addition, the HKCEC is served by numerous franchised bus routes operated by New World First Bus, including several cross-harbour routes operated jointly with Kowloon Motor Bus.

In popular culture

During the Chinese campaign of the 2003 video game Command & Conquer: Generals, the player is ordered to destroy the HKCEC with military force after it falls under the control of a fictional terrorist group, the Global Liberation Army. The game series was banned in China.
It is also the setting for the grand finale in both New Police Story starring Jackie Chan, and Gen-X Cops.
The structure played a major part in the film Transformers: Age of Extinction, where a Decepticon ship is seen destroying the structure from above.

See also

 Golden Bauhinia Square
 Hong Kong Trade Development Council (and HKTDC Trade Fairs)
 Wan Chai

References

External links

 The HKCEC Official website 
 AIA Chicago:Distinguished Building Award: Hong Kong Convention and Exhibition Centre Extension
 SOM Project Webpage
 Wong & Ouyang Project Webpage
 Wong & Ouyang (HK) Ltd., "More than half-a-century of architectural design experience in Hong Kong", section "Hong Kong Convention and Exhibition Centre Expansion Project", pp. 52–57, September 2009

1997 establishments in Hong Kong
Artificial islands of Hong Kong
Commercial buildings completed in 1997
Convention and exhibition centres in Hong Kong
Cultural infrastructure completed in 1997
Landmarks in Hong Kong
Music venues in Hong Kong
NWS Holdings
Skidmore, Owings & Merrill buildings
Wan Chai North